Getaway is the fourth album by rock band Reef, released in 2000.

Track listing
All music composed by Reef; all lyrics composed by Gary Stringer, except where noted.
"Set the Record Straight" – 3:55
"Superhero" – 3:07
"Getaway" – 3:49
"Solid" – 3:53
"All I Want" (lyrics: Dominic Greensmith) – 4:18
"Hold On" – 3:11
"Saturday" – 4:05
"Won't You Listen?" – 3:52
"Levels" – 5:09
"Pretenders" – 3:48
"I Do Not Know What They Will Do" – 3:12

Singles
"Set The Record Straight" #19 UK
"Superhero" #55 UK
"All I Want" #51 UK

Personnel

Reef
Gary Stringer – vocals, guitar
Kenwyn House – guitar 
Jack Bessant – bass
Dominic Greensmith – drums

Other personnel
Alistair Clay – producer, engineer, mixing  
Delores Lewis – additional vocals, keyboards
Jason Knight – keyboards 
Christopher Allan – cello   
Ben Castle – saxophone
Matthew Ward – violin 
Nell Catchpole – violin 
Duncan McKay, Paul Newton, Jerry Hey – trumpet 
Nichol Thomson – trombone 
Alex Clark – Pro Tools engineering 
Rick Guest – photography 
David Sims – portrait photography

Charts

References

2000 albums
Reef (band) albums
Albums recorded at The Church Studios